Pat O'Brien may refer to:

Politicians
Pat O'Brien (Canadian politician) (born 1948), member of the Canadian House of Commons
Pat O'Brien (Irish politician) (c. 1847–1917), Irish Nationalist MP in the United Kingdom Parliament

Others
Pat O'Brien (actor) (1899–1983), American film actor
Pat O'Brien (guitarist) (born 1965), American guitarist for Cannibal Corpse
Pat O'Brien (radio and television personality) (born 1948), American sports commentator and television host
Pat O'Brien (rugby union) (born 1989), South African rugby union player
Pat O'Brien of Pat O'Brien's Bar, US cocktail maker
Maynard O'Brien, American football coach nicknamed Pat

See also
Patrick O'Brien (disambiguation)